Vítor Hugo Magalhães Pinto (born 12 April 1986) is a Portuguese football defender who plays for Berço. He played on the Portuguese second tier for Moreirense and Freamunde.

References

1986 births
Living people
Portuguese footballers
SC Mirandela players
AC Vila Meã players
G.D. Serzedelo players
Moreirense F.C. players
S.C. Freamunde players
F.C. Felgueiras 1932 players
Merelinense F.C. players
Berço SC players
Association football midfielders
Liga Portugal 2 players